Lagaan (English: Taxation) is a 2001 Indian sports drama film, written and directed by Ashutosh Gowariker. The film stars Aamir Khan, who also produced the film, and Gracy Singh in the lead roles. Yashpal Sharma, Raghubir Yadav, Rachel Shelley, and Paul Blackthorne feature in supporting roles. The film was edited by Ballu Saluja, with music and cinematography provided by A. R. Rahman, and Anil Mehta respectively. Lagaan is set in India in 1893, during the British Raj. The film tells the story of a small village whose inhabitants are oppressed by high taxes. They are challenged to a cricket match by an arrogant officer as a wager to avoid the taxes.

Lagaan was released on 15 June 2001. It received nominations, and awards in several categories both in India and internationally, with particular praise for its direction, acting and landscapes.

Lagaan was nominated for the Best Foreign Language Film at the 74th Academy Awards, becoming the third Indian film to be nominated in the category after Mother India (1957), and Salaam Bombay! (1988). At the 49th National Film Awards, the film won a total of eight awards, including for Best Popular Film Providing Wholesome Entertainment. It also won eight honours at the 47th Filmfare Awards—Best Film, Best Director, and Best Story awards for Gowariker and the Best Actor award for Khan. At the 8th Screen Awards, Lagaan received nominations for Best Story, and Best Actor, going on to win Best Film and Best Director. The film also won nine awards at the 3rd IIFA Awards, including Best Actor, and Best Movie.

Channel 4 listed Lagaan at number 14 in its list of "Top 50 Films to See Before you Die". In 2010, the film was ranked at number 55 in the Empire list of "The 100 Best Films of World Cinema". In 2011, it was listed in Time's list of "The All-Time 25 Best Sports Movies". The film was also included in CNN-IBN's list of the "100 greatest Indian films of all time" in 2013.

Accolades

See also
 List of awards and nominations received by Aamir Khan
 List of Bollywood films of 2001

Footnotes

References

External links
 Accolades for Lagaan at the Internet Movie Database

Lagaan